The Battle of Tauberbischofsheim was an engagement of the Austro-Prussian War of 1866, on the 24 July at Tauberbischofsheim in the Grand Duchy of Baden between troops of the German Confederation and the Kingdom of Prussia. It was part of the campaign of the Main and ended with a Prussian victory.

Preliminary campaign
After the Prussian Mainarmee (German for: army of the river Main) had beaten the Bavarians at Kissingen, the Bavarian army retreated to Würzburg. The Prussians now turned west against the 8th Confederate Army (troops of Württemberg, Baden, Hesse and Nassau) which protected Frankfurt. After the 8th Army had lost the Battle of Frohnhofen, near Aschaffenburg, it gave up the defence of Frankfurt and went south-eastward to unite with the Bavarians at the river Tauber. The Prussian army followed.

The battle
The 8th Army, consisting of four divisions under the command of Prince Alexander of Hesse, was distributed to the following places on the day of the battle: The Württemberg division was in the centre at Tauberbischofsheim, the Baden division on the right flank at Werbach, the Grand Ducal Hessian division at Großrinderfeld and a division mixed of troops from Austria and Nassau on the left flank at Grünsfeld-Paimar. The Prussians were able to push back the federal troops in Tauberbischofsheim. The counter attacks failed and troops of Württemberg suffered a comprehensive defeat. At Werbach the troops of Baden were also beaten.

Aftermath
After further clashes the next two days at Gerchsheim, Uettingen, Helmstadt and Roßbrunn, which ended in favor of the Prussians, the federal troops withdrew to Würzburg where a truce ended the fighting. The Prussians occupied northern Württemberg and negotiated a peace in August 1866. Württemberg paid an indemnity of 8,000,000 gulden, and concluded a secret offensive and defensive treaty with her conqueror.

Although not officially part of the North German Confederation, the secret treaty effectively bound Württemberg to Prussia. A few years later, in 1870, Württemberger troops played a creditable part in the Battle of Wörth and in other operations of the Franco-Prussian War. In 1871, Württemberg became a member of the new German Empire.

Memorials

References

External links
 Battle of Tauberbischofsheim, 24 July 1866

Battles of the Austro-Prussian War
Battles involving Austria
Battles involving Prussia
1866 in Baden
July 1866 events
1866 in Germany
Battles in Baden-Württemberg